Time and Chance is the third studio album by the jazz fusion band Caldera, released in 1978 on Capitol Records. The album rose to No. 29 on the Billboard Jazz Albums chart.

Track listing

Personnel
 Jorge Strunz — acoustic guitar, electric guitar
 Eduardo del Barrio — acoustic piano, electric piano, synthesizers, Moog, Roland, Oberheim Polyphonic, Yamaha Polyphonic
 Steve Tavaglione — flute, alto saxophone, soprano saxophone
 Mike Azeredo — congas, percussion
 Carlos Vega — drums
 Greg Lee — electric bass, Moog bass pedals
 Hector Andrade — timbales, congas, percussion

Guests
 Larry Dunn — synthesizer (track 8)
 Roberto da Silva — drums (track 8 only)
 Alex Acuña — drums (tracks 1, 2, 3, 4, 5, 6, 7 and 9 )
 Luis Conte — bata, conga and timbales (track 9 only)
 Akim Robert Davis — bata (track 9 only)
 George del Barrio — acoustic piano (track 4 only), electric piano (track 5 only)
 Charles Faris — digital aquasonic modulator (track 8 only)
 Dianne Reeves — background vocals (tracks 8 only)
 Michelle Wiley — background vocals (tracks 8 only)
 Ella Faulk — background vocals (tracks 8 only)

References

1978 albums
Capitol Records albums
Caldera (band) albums
Reissue albums